José María Vidal Bravo (6 May 1935 – 1 August 1986) was a Spanish footballer who played as a midfielder in the mid 20th century.

Club career
Born in Madrid, Vidal spent nine years of his senior career linked to Real Madrid, but he was loaned several times during his spell. He only spent four seasons with the first team, winning three La Liga championships and one Copa del Generalísimo; additionally, in the 1959–60 edition of the European Cup, he contributed with six games and one goal as the tournament ended in conquest.

Vidal amassed Spanish top flight totals of 117 matches and four goals, also representing in the competition CD Málaga and Levante UD. He died at the age of 51 in Valencia, from a heart attack.

International career
Vidal earned four caps for the Spanish national team in slightly less than one year, making his debut on 14 July 1960 by playing the second half of a 4–0 friendly win in Chile.

Honours
Real Madrid
European Cup: 1959–60
Intercontinental Cup: 1960
La Liga: 1960–61, 1961–62
Copa del Generalísimo: 1961–62

References

External links
 
 National team data at BDFutbol
 
 Amigos Malaguistas stats 

1935 births
1986 deaths
Footballers from Madrid
Spanish footballers
Association football midfielders
La Liga players
Segunda División players
Real Madrid CF players
UD Salamanca players
Real Zaragoza players
Real Madrid Castilla footballers
Granada CF footballers
Real Murcia players
CD Málaga footballers
Levante UD footballers
Real Valladolid players
Eredivisie players
Sparta Rotterdam players
National Professional Soccer League (1967) players
Philadelphia Spartans players
Spain international footballers
Spanish expatriate footballers
Expatriate footballers in the Netherlands
Expatriate soccer players in the United States
UEFA Champions League winning players